Point Reyes Farmstead Cheese Company is an artisanal cheese company located in Point Reyes Station in Marin County, California with dairy farmland located in the Point Reyes area. The company received the 2013 California Leopold Conservation Award, and has been featured on the Today Show. The company is operated by Bob Giacomini and his four daughters, Karen Howard, Diana Hagan, Lynn Stray and Jill Basch. Co-founder Dean Mae Giacomini, Mr. Giacomini's wife, died in 2012. The Point Reyes dairy's operations began in 1959. The cheese company was founded in 2000. The family also operates The Fork, a culinary education center. Their flagship, award-winning cheese, the raw milk Point Reyes Original Blue was the only blue cheese produced in California when it was introduced.

See also
 List of cheesemakers

References

External links

 Official website

Cheesemakers
Dairy products companies in California
Companies based in Marin County, California
West Marin
Food and drink companies established in 2000
2000 establishments in California
Food and drink in the San Francisco Bay Area